Grégoire Yachvili (born 30 May 1977, in Brive) is a former French rugby union player and a current coach. He played as a flanker. He was born in France to a Georgian father and an Armenian mother. His father, Michel Yachvili and brother Dimitri Yachvili, were also international players for their adopted country.

Club career
Yachvili played for La Teste-de-Buch, Union Bordeaux-Bègles, Racing 92 (2002/03), Stade Bordelais (2003/04-2005/06), after the fusion with this team he played for Union Bordeau-Bègles (2006/07-2008/09), Libourne (2009/10-2010/11) and Lormont (2011/12-2012/13).

International career
He was invited to adopt Georgian citizenship, due to his father, so that he could play for Georgia. He accepted the invitation. He had 12 caps for Georgia, from 2001 to 2003, scoring 2 tries, 10 points on aggregate. He was called for the 2003 Rugby World Cup, playing in three games but without scoring.

Coach career
He has been the head coach of Lormont, at the Fédérale 2, since 2014.

References

External links
Grégoire Yachvili International Statistics

1977 births
Living people
People from Brive-la-Gaillarde
Rugby union players from Georgia (country)
French rugby union players
Rugby union flankers
French people of Armenian descent
French people of Georgian descent
Sportspeople from Corrèze
Georgia international rugby union players
CA Bordeaux-Bègles Gironde players
Stade Bordelais players
Union Bordeaux Bègles players
Racing 92 players